"Zebra" is the first single released from the John Butler Trio's album Sunrise Over Sea. Featuring the Sunrise lineup of John Butler on guitar/vocals, Shannon Birchall on double bass and Nicky Bomba on drums/percussion, it blends the genres of folk, funk, rock, and a bit of blues.

Zebra is exceptionally known for its catchy refrain and lyrics which are entirely about opposites, for example "I can be alive, man, or be the walking dead" or "I can be black or I can be white".

Inspiration
According to John Butler, the song began as a riff that he had stuck in his head for several years, but had difficulty recalling when he had a guitar. The lyric pattern of "I could be da da, I could be da da" originated from Butler scat singing the riff to his baby daughter, while the opposites in each line of the lyrics led Nicky Bomba to the idea of a zebra asking itself if it was white with black stripes or black with white stripes, from which the song's title is derived.

Music video
The music video for Zebra features Butler and the band recording the song in a studio which seems like a small, worn out back shed. It is also interspersed with footage of Butler on his skateboard.

Track listing
All tracks written by John Butler.

 "Zebra" – 3:56
 "Media" (Live at the Wireless for Triple J) – 7:10
 "Losing My Cool" (previously unreleased) – 8:10

Personnel
John Butler Trio
John Butler – Amplified 11-string acoustic guitar, banjo, lead vocals
Shannon Birchall – Double bass, electric bass, backing vocals
Nicky Bomba – Drums, percussion, backing vocals

Additional musicians
Michael Barker – cookie spoons, congas (Track 1)
Michael Caruana – Hammond organ (Track 1)
Dave Pensabene – backing vocals (Track 1)

Charts

Weekly charts

Year-end charts

References

2003 singles
APRA Award winners
John Butler Trio songs
Songs written by John Butler (musician)
Jarrah Records singles